The 1995 World Juniors Track Cycling Championships were the 21st annual Junior World Championships for track cycling held in Forlì, San Marino in August 1995.

The Championships had five events for men (Sprint, Points race, Individual pursuit, Team pursuit and 1 kilometre time trial) and two for women (Individual pursuit and Sprint).

Events

Medal table

References

UCI Juniors Track World Championships
1995 in track cycling
1995 in Sammarinese sport